"Do You Love What You Feel" is a soul/disco song by Rufus and Chaka.

Background
"Do You Love What You Feel" was released in late 1979 from the Quincy Jones produced album, Masterjam.

Charts
"Do You Love What You Feel" spent three weeks at the top of the Hot Soul Singles chart, becoming the fourth of five songs that they would send to the top of that chart; it was the final single to top that chart during the 1970s.  It also peaked at number thirty on the Billboard Hot 100 singles chart. Along with the track, "Any Love", "Do You Love What You Feel" peaked at number five on the disco charts.

Chart positions

References

1979 singles
Chaka Khan songs
Disco songs
Song recordings produced by Quincy Jones
Songs written by Hawk Wolinski
1979 songs
MCA Records singles